A wrestling ring is the stage on which a professional wrestling match usually occurs. It is similarly constructed to a boxing ring and is traditionally square-shaped.

Configuration and construction

The configuration and construction of the traditional wrestling ring closely resembles that of a boxing ring. Like boxing rings, wrestling rings are also known by the poetic name of the "squared circle", which derives from how combative exhibitions would often be held in a roughly drawn circle on the ground.

Wrestling rings are generally composed of an elevated steel beam and wood plank stage topped by foam padding and a canvas cover.

Around the ring are three ring ropes, one fewer than modern boxing rings, which have had four ropes since the 1970s. The materials used for the ropes differ depending on the ring builder or promotion. Some, like WWE, use natural fiber ropes wrapped in tape, while others use steel cables that are encased in rubber hose. Unlike a boxing ring, the ring ropes in a wrestling ring are not tethered together. These ropes are held up and tensioned by turnbuckles, which, in turn, hang on steel ring posts, which also support the frame. The ends of the turnbuckles facing into the ring are padded, either individually, or with a large pad for all three similar to a boxing ring, as in New Japan Pro-Wrestling. A portion of the mat extends outside the ring ropes, known as the ring apron. The elevated sides of the ring are covered with a fabric skirt to prevent spectators from seeing underneath.

Usually around ringside there are steel steps that wrestlers can use to enter and exit the ring. All parts of the ring are often used as part of various offensive and defensive moves.

WWE, All Elite Wrestling, and Ring of Honor use a 20-foot ring, while in the past World Championship Wrestling and Extreme Championship Wrestling used, and Impact Wrestling and Major League Wrestling currently use, an 18-foot ring. Typically, wrestling rings are smaller than boxing rings.

Variations

While the traditional ring is four-sided, other configurations exist, such as six-sided rings. The first known regular use of hexagonal rings in professional wrestling was for the Japanese lucha libre based promotion Toryumon 2000 Project which held its first show in 2001. Hexagonal rings have been used for special occasions such as Lucha Libre AAA World Wide's annual Triplemania event. Impact Wrestling (then known as Total Nonstop Action Wrestling, or TNA) first used one beginning in 2004, before reverting to a four-sided ring in 2010. In June 2014, the six-sided ring returned to the promotion, but was dropped again in January 2018.

See also
 Dohyō
 Octagon (mixed martial arts)
 Glossary of professional wrestling terms

References

Professional wrestling
Martial arts equipment